"Jealous" is a song by English electronic musician Labrinth. Written with Josh Kear and Natalie Hemby, the song was released on 23 November 2014.

Style and production
Labrinth wrote "Jealous" in Nashville, Tennessee with Josh Kear and Natalie Hemby. It was produced by Labrinth and arranged by Gustave Rudman. The song, described as a "heart-breaking ballad" by MTV, is addressed to one of Labrinth's parents, who left the family when he was four years old. Speaking about the lyrical content of the song, Labrinth has offered the following explanation:

Release and reception
The song, along with its accompanying music video, debuted on 31 October 2014. The single was released on 23 November 2014. The song re-entered the charts at number 25 in September 2015, following a performance from contestant Josh Daniel on The X Factor.

Charts

Certifications

References

External links
Official music video on YouTube

2014 songs
2014 singles
Labrinth songs
Pop ballads
Soul ballads
Song recordings produced by Labrinth
Songs written by Natalie Hemby
Songs written by Josh Kear
Syco Music singles
Songs written by Labrinth